The 1939 Baltimore mayoral election saw the reelection of Howard W. Jackson for a third consecutive and fourth overall term.

General election
The general election was held May 2.

References

Baltimore mayoral
Mayoral elections in Baltimore
Baltimore